Paragorgopis oreas is a species of ulidiid or picture-winged fly in the genus Paragorgopis of the family Tephritidae.

References

oreas
Insects described in 1892